Free Derry Corner is a historical landmark in the Bogside neighbourhood of Derry, Northern Ireland, which lies in the intersection of the Lecky Road, Rossville Street and Fahan Street. A free-standing gable wall commemorates Free Derry, a self-declared autonomous nationalist area of Derry that existed between 1969 and 1972. On the corner is a memorial to the 1981 hunger strikers and several murals. There is also a memorial to those who died engaging in paramilitary activity as part of the Provisional IRA's Derry Brigade.

On 5 January 1969 a local activist, long believed to be John "Caker" Casey, but who might have been Liam Hillen, painted graffiti on a gable wall at the end of a housing terrace stating "You are now entering Free Derry". When the British Home Secretary, Jim Callaghan, visited Derry in August 1969, the "Free Derry" wall was painted white and the "You are now entering Free Derry" sign was professionally re-painted in black lettering. The area in front of the wall became known as Free Derry Corner by the inhabitants. It and the surrounding streets were the scene of the Battle of the Bogside in 1969 and Bloody Sunday in 1972. The houses on Lecky Road and Fahan Street were subsequently demolished, but the wall was retained. It has been repainted at frequent intervals.  As currently situated, it now lies in the central reservation of Lecky Road, which was upgraded to a dual carriageway sometime following the demolition of the original terraced houses.

References

External links

 Photograph of the original slogan at Museum Of Free Derry.
 A visual history of Free Derry Corner.
 A BBC gallery of 12 images of Free Derry Corner.
 Free Derry Wall Painter Passes Away 

Derry (city)
The Troubles in Derry (city)